Mauro Julián Molina (born 29 July 1999) is an Argentine professional footballer who plays as a forward for Temperley, on loan from Independiente.

Career
Molina joined Independiente's youth system in 2005. He began his senior career with the club in the Primera División in 2017. His professional debut came on 9 December, appearing for the final moments of a 1–2 win over Arsenal de Sarandí. Seven appearances followed across 2018–19, as did his first senior goal in a 4–0 Copa Argentina win over Atlas on 6 March 2019. Molina didn't feature competitively in 2019–20, partly due to injury and the COVID-19 pandemic. In September 2020, Molina was loaned to Primera B Nacional with Temperley.

On 15 February 2022, Molina joined Primera Nacional club Quilmes until the end of the year.

Personal life
In August 2020, it was announced that Molina had tested positive for COVID-19 amid the pandemic; he isolated with mild symptoms.

Career statistics
.

References

External links

1999 births
Living people
People from Florencio Varela Partido
Argentine footballers
Association football forwards
Argentine Primera División players
Club Atlético Independiente footballers
Club Atlético Temperley footballers
Quilmes Atlético Club footballers
Sportspeople from Buenos Aires Province